Harwich  is a town in Essex, England, and one of the Haven ports on the North Sea coast. It is in the Tendring district. Nearby places include Felixstowe to the north-east, Ipswich to the north-west, Colchester to the south-west and Clacton-on-Sea to the south. It is the northernmost coastal town in Essex.

Its position on the estuaries of the Stour and Orwell rivers, with its usefulness to mariners as the only safe anchorage between the Thames and the Humber, led to a long period of civil and military maritime significance. The town became a naval base in 1657 and was heavily fortified, with Harwich Redoubt, Beacon Hill Battery, and Bath Side Battery.

Harwich is the likely launch point of the Mayflower, which carried English Puritans to North America, and is the presumed birthplace of Mayflower captain Christopher Jones.

Harwich today is contiguous with Dovercourt and the two, along with Parkeston, are often referred to collectively as Harwich.

History

The town's name means "military settlement", from Old English here-wic.

The town received its charter in 1238, although there is evidence of earlier settlement – for example, a record of a chapel in 1177, and some indications of a possible Roman presence.

The town was the target of an abortive raid by French forces under Antonio Doria on 24 March 1339 during the Hundred Years' War.

Because of its strategic position, Harwich was the target for the invasion of Britain by William of Orange on 11 November 1688. However, unfavourable winds forced his fleet to sail into the English Channel instead and eventually land at Torbay. Due to the involvement of the Schomberg family in the invasion, Charles Louis Schomberg was made Marquess of Harwich.

Writer Daniel Defoe devotes a few pages to the town in A tour thro' the Whole Island of Great Britain. Visiting in 1722, he noted its formidable fort and harbour "of a vast extent". The town, he recounts, was also known for an unusual chalybeate spring rising on Beacon Hill (a promontory to the north-east of the town), which "petrified" clay, allowing it to be used to pave Harwich's streets and build its walls. The locals also claimed that "the same spring is said to turn wood into iron", but Defoe put this down to the presence of "copperas" in the water. Regarding the atmosphere of the town, he states: "Harwich is a town of hurry and business, not much of gaiety and pleasure; yet the inhabitants seem warm in their nests and some of them are very wealthy".

Harwich played an important part in the Napoleonic and more especially the two world wars. Of particular note:

1793-1815—Post Office Station for communication with Europe, one of embarkation and evacuation bases for expeditions to Holland in 1799, 1809 and 1813/14; base for capturing enemy privateers. The dockyard built many ships for the Navy, including HMS Conqueror which captured the French Admiral Villeneuve at the Battle of Trafalgar. The Redoubt and the now-demolished Ordnance Building date from that era.

1914-18—base for the Royal Navy's Harwich Force light cruisers and destroyers under Commodore Tyrwhitt, and for British submarines. In November 1918 the German U-boat fleet surrendered to the Royal Navy in the harbour.

1939-1945—one of main East Coast minesweeping and destroyer bases, at one period base for British and French submarines; assembled fleets for Dutch and Dunkirk evacuations and follow-up to D-Day; unusually, a target for Italian bombers during the Battle of Britain.

Royal Naval Dockyard

Harwich Dockyard was established as a Naval Dockyard in 1652. It ceased to operate as a Royal Dockyard in 1713 (though a Royal Navy presence was maintained until 1829). During the various wars with France and Holland, through to 1815, the dockyard was responsible for both building and repairing numerous warships. HMS Conqueror, a 74-gun ship completed in 1801, captured the French admiral Villeneuve at Trafalgar. The yard was then a semi-private concern, with the actual shipbuilding contracted to Joseph Graham, who was sometimes mayor of the town. During World War II parts of Harwich were again requisitioned for naval use and ships were based at HMS Badger; Badger was decommissioned in 1946, but the Royal Naval Auxiliary Service maintained a headquarters on the site until 1992.

Lighthouses

In 1665, not long after the establishment of the Dockyard, a pair of lighthouses were set up on the Town Green to serve as leading lights for ships entering the harbour. Completely rebuilt in 1818, both towers are still standing (though they ceased functioning as lighthouses in 1863, when they were replaced by a new pair of lights at Dovercourt).

Transport

The Royal Navy no longer has a presence in Harwich but Harwich International Port at nearby Parkeston continues to offer regular ferry services to the Hook of Holland (Hoek van Holland) in the Netherlands. Mann Lines operates a roll-on roll-off ferry service from Harwich Navyard to Bremerhaven, Cuxhaven, Paldiski and Turku.
Many operations of the Port of Felixstowe and of Trinity House, the lighthouse authority, are managed from Harwich.

The line also allows freight trains to access the Port.

The port is famous for the phrase "Harwich for the Continent", seen on road signs and in London and North Eastern Railway (LNER) advertisements.

From 1924 to 1987 (with a break during the Second World War), a train ferry service operated between Harwich and Zeebrugge. The train ferry linkspan still exists today and the rails leading from the former goods yard of Harwich Town railway station are still in position across the road, although the line is blocked by the Trinity House buoy store.

Architecture 

Despite, or perhaps because of, its small size Harwich is highly regarded in terms of architectural heritage, and the whole of the older part of the town, excluding Navyard Wharf, is a conservation area.

The regular street plan with principal thoroughfares connected by numerous small alleys indicates the town's medieval origins, although many buildings of this period are hidden behind 18th century facades.

The extant medieval structures are largely private homes.  The house featured in the image of Kings Head St to the left is unique in the town and is an example of a sailmaker's house, thought to have been built circa 1600.  Notable public buildings include the parish church of St. Nicholas (1821) in a restrained Gothic style, with many original furnishings, including a somewhat altered organ in the west end gallery. There is also the Guildhall of 1769, the only Grade I listed building in Harwich.

The Pier Hotel of 1860 and the building that was the Great Eastern Hotel of 1864 can both been seen on the quayside, both reflecting the town's new importance to travellers following the arrival of the Great Eastern Main Line from Colchester in 1854. In 1923, The Great Eastern Hotel was closed by the newly formed LNER, as the Great Eastern Railway had opened a new hotel with the same name at the new passenger port at Parkeston Quay, causing a decline in numbers.
The hotel became the Harwich Town Hall, which included the Magistrates Court and, following changes in local government, was sold and divided into apartments.

Also of interest are the High Lighthouse (1818), the unusual Treadwheel Crane (late 17th century), the Old Custom Houses on West Street, a number of Victorian shopfronts and the Electric Palace Cinema (1911), one of the oldest purpose-built cinemas to survive complete with its ornamental frontage and original projection room still intact and operational.

There is little notable building from the later parts of the 20th century, but major recent additions include the lifeboat station and two new structures for Trinity House. The Trinity House office building, next door to the Old Custom Houses, was completed in 2005. All three additions are influenced by the high-tech style.

International Shanty Festival 

A Harwich International Shanty Festival was set up in 2006 to organise and co-ordinate an annual sea shanty festival in October. Through concerts, 'singarounds', pub sessions, talks and workshops, the seafaring history and heritage of Harwich is celebrated by local people and international groups. This unique event for Essex attracts audiences countrywide and beyond. The festival is one of the biggest shanty festivals in the country.

Notable residents
Harwich has also historically hosted a number of notable inhabitants, linked with Harwich's maritime past.

 Christopher Newport (1561–1617) seaman and privateer, captain of the expedition that founded Jamestown, Virginia
 Christopher Jones (c.1570–1622) Captain of the 1620 voyage of the Pilgrim ship Mayflower
 Thomas Cobbold (1708–1767), brewer and owner of Three Cups
 William Shearman (1767–1861) physician and medical writer
 James Francillon (1802–1866) barrister and legal writer
 Captain Charles Fryatt (1872–1916) mariner executed by the Germans, brought back from Belgium and buried at Dovercourt
 Peter Firmin (1928- 2018) artist and puppet maker
 Randolph Stow (1935–2010) reclusive but award-winning Australian-born writer made his home in Harwich
 Myles de Vries (born 1940), first-class cricketer
 Liana Bridges (born 1969) actress, best known for co-presenting Sooty & Co
 Kate Hall (born 1983) British-Danish singer

Politicians 

 Sir John Jacob, 1st Baronet of Bromley (c.1597–1666) politician who sat in the House of Commons in 1640 and 1641
 Sir Capel Luckyn, 2nd Baronet (1622–1680) politician who sat in the House of Commons variously between 1647 and 1679
 Samuel Pepys (1633–1703) diarist and member of parliament (MP) for Harwich
 Sir Anthony Deane (1638–1721) Mayor of Harwich, naval architect, Master Shipwright, commercial shipbuilder and MP
 Lieutenant-General Edward Harvey (1718–1788) Adjutant-General to the Forces and MP for Harwich 1768 to 1778
 Tony Newton, Baron Newton of Braintree OBE, PC, DL (1937–2012) Conservative politician and former Cabinet member
 Nick Alston (born 1952) Conservative Essex Police and Crime Commissioner
 Bernard Jenkin (born 1959) Conservative politician, MP for Harwich and North Essex since 2010 
 Andrew Murrison VR (born 1961) doctor and Conservative Party politician, MP since 2001
 Dan Rowe singer

Sport

Harwich is home to Harwich & Parkeston F.C.; Harwich and Dovercourt RFC; Harwich Rangers FC; Sunday Shrimpers; Harwich & Dovercourt Sailing Club; Harwich, Dovercourt & Parkeston Swimming Club; Harwich & Dovercourt Rugby Union Football Club; Harwich & Dovercourt Cricket Club; and Harwich Runners who with support from Harwich Swimming Club host the annual Harwich Triathlons.

Arms

See also 
 Harwich Force
 Harwich Redoubt
 Harwich (UK Parliament constituency)
 Harwich and Dovercourt High School
 Harwich Lifeboat Station
 Harwich Mayflower Heritage Centre
 Harwich refinery

Notes

References

External links 
 
 
 Harwich Town Council
 The Harwich Society

 
Port cities and towns in the East of England
Port cities and towns of the North Sea
Ports and harbours of Essex
Towns in Essex
Populated coastal places in Essex
Tendring